Dicerca spreta is a species of metallic wood-boring beetle in the family Buprestidae. It is endemic to the eastern United States.

References

Further reading

 
 
 

Buprestidae
Beetles of the United States
Endemic fauna of the United States
Beetles described in 1841
Articles created by Qbugbot